"Feelin' Like Tunechi" is a song by American rappers Lil Wayne and Rich the Kid from their collaborative mixtape Trust Fund Babies, released on October 1, 2021. It was produced by The Lab Cook.

Composition
The song features Latin-inspired production and finds the rappers giving their appreciation of each other's lifestyles.

Critical reception
The song received generally positive reviews from critics. Critics have considered the song a good start to the mixtape Trust Fund Babies. Abou Kamara of The Ringer wrote that it "perfectly harnesses the Lethal Weapon buddy-cop potential between the duo". In a Pitchfork review of Trust Fund Babies, Alphonse Pierre negatively reviewed the song, writing that Rich the Kid "continues to have no identity of his own, switching between that tired triplet flow and a lazy Young Thug impersonation throughout (most egregiously on the chorus of "Feelin' Like Tunechi")".

Music video
An accompanying music video was directed by Arrad. It opens with the rappers driving to an alleyway in a red McLaren, and cuts to a spoof of the video of Lil Wayne's 2012 deposition.

Charts

References

2021 singles
2021 songs
Lil Wayne songs
Rich the Kid songs
Songs written by Lil Wayne
Songs written by Rich the Kid
Young Money Entertainment singles
Republic Records singles
Rostrum Records singles